A construction foreman, construction forewoman, or construction foreperson is the worker or skilled tradesperson who is in charge of a construction crew. This role is generally assumed by a senior worker.

Duties and functions
Normally the foreman is a construction worker with many years of experience in a particular trade who is charged with organizing the overall construction of a particular project for a particular contractor. Typically the foreman is a person with specialist knowledge of a given trade who has moved into the position and is now focused on an overall management of their trade on the job site. They are responsible for providing proper documentation to their workers so they can proceed with tasks.

Specifically, a foreman may train employees under their supervision, ensure appropriate use of equipment by employees, communicate progress on the project to a supervisor and maintain the employee schedule. Foremen may also arrange for materials to be at the construction site and evaluate plans for each construction job.

Not to be confused with a Project Manager, Project Supervisor, Superintendent, General Foreman, or a "Firstman".

See also
 Civil engineering

References

Foreman